Robert Emile Adair (1876 – 18 March 1951) was an Irish cricketer. He was a right-handed batsman and a right-arm fast-medium bowler.

He first played for Ireland against I Zingari in August 1899, and next played in Ireland's first four first-class matches in 1902, his last coming against Cambridge University. He later played for a Scottish Counties team against Yorkshire in 1910 in a match that was abandoned after one day due to the death of King Edward VII.

References
Scorecard of match for Scottish Counties
Cricket Archive profile
CricketEurope Stats Zone profile
Cricinfo profile

1876 births
1951 deaths
Irish cricketers
Ulster Scots people